Oregon Shipbuilding Corporation was a World War II emergency shipyard located along the Willamette River in Portland, Oregon, United States. The shipyard built nearly 600 Liberty and Victory ships between 1941 and 1945 under the Emergency Shipbuilding program. It was closed after the war ended.

The shipyard, one of three Kaiser Shipyards in the area, was in the St. Johns neighborhood of North Portland. The two others were the Swan Island Shipyard, located several miles upriver on Swan Island; and the Vancouver Shipyard, located across the Columbia River from Portland in Vancouver, Washington.

Among the ships built by Oregon Shipbuilding was the Star of Oregon, which was launched on Liberty Fleet Day, September 27, 1941.

The rapid expansion of Portland area shipyards during World War II and contraction afterward caused similar expansion and contraction of the population of Vanport City, Oregon, which was also built by Henry J. Kaiser to house the workers of the three area shipyards.

The former site of Oregon Shipbuilding in St. Johns is now Schnitzer Steel Industries.

See also
 Swan Island Municipal Airport

References

External links
 

Shipbuilding companies of Oregon
Defunct shipbuilding companies of the United States
Henry J. Kaiser
.
United States home front during World War II
Companies based in St. Johns, Portland, Oregon
American companies established in 1941
Vehicle manufacturing companies established in 1941
Vehicle manufacturing companies disestablished in 1946
1941 establishments in Oregon
1946 disestablishments in Oregon
Defunct companies based in Oregon
Vigor Shipyards